
Gmina Nowy Tomyśl is an urban-rural gmina (administrative district) in Nowy Tomyśl County, Greater Poland Voivodeship, in west-central Poland.

Villages
Apart from the town of Nowy Tomyśl, Gmina Nowy Tomyśl contains the villages and settlements of Boruja Kościelna, Bukowiec, Chojniki, Cicha Góra, Glinno, Grubsko, Jastrzębsko Stare, Kozie Laski, Nowa Róża, Paproć, Przyłęk, Róża, Sątopy, Sękowo, Stary Tomyśl, Szarki and Wytomyśl.

Neighbouring gminas
Gmina Nowy Tomyśl is bordered by the gminas of Grodzisk Wielkopolski, Kuślin, Lwówek, Miedzichowo, Opalenica, Rakoniewice, Siedlec and Zbąszyń.

References

External links
Polish official population figures 2006

Nowy Tomysl
Nowy Tomyśl County